The National Administrative Department of Statistics (DANE) does not collect religious statistics, and accurate reports are difficult to obtain. However, based on various studies and a survey, about 90% of the population adheres to Christianity, the majority of which (70.9%) are Roman Catholic, while a significant minority (16.7%) adhere to Protestantism (primarily Evangelicalism). Protestant Christians present in Colombia are Baptists, Lutherans, Mennonites, Nazarenes, Pentecostals and Seventh-day Adventists. The government generally is in support of religious freedom.

List of Denominations 
Alianza Cristiana y Misionera
Assemblies of God
Asociación de Iglesias Hermanos Menonitas de Colombia: 831 (1998)
Church of God Ministry of Jesus Christ International
Church of the Nazarene: 12,860 (1998)
Hermanos en Cristo
Iglesia Cruzada Evangélica
Iglesia de Dios
Iglesia Evangélica Luterana
Misión Evangélica
Mision Indigena
Misión Nuevas Tribus
Presbyterian Church of Colombia
Unión Misionera Evangélica
Seventh-day Adventist Church: 241,029

See also
Protestantism by country

External links
Adherents.com - Religion by Location
2000 Caribbean, Central & South America Mennonite & Brethren in Christ Churches
World Christian Encyclopedia: Second edition, Volume 1, pp 205 /206
Colombia, International Religious Freedom Report 2006
Union Columbiana Adventista del Séptimo Día
Colombia: nationwide Adventist effort feeds 80,000 in two hours

References

 
Colombia